Abarim is the Hebrew name used in the Bible for a mountain range "across the Jordan", understood as east of the Jordan Rift Valley, i.e. in Transjordan, to the east and south-east of the Dead Sea, extending from Mount Nebo — its highest point — in the north, perhaps to the Arabian desert in the south.

Etymology and description
According to Cheyne and Black, its Hebrew meaning is "'Those-on-the-other-side'—i.e., of the Jordan." The Vulgate (Deuteronomy 32:49) gives its etymological meaning as passages. Its northern part was called Pisgah, and the highest peak of Pisgah was Mount Nebo (Numbers 23:14; 27:12; 21:20; 32:47; Deuteronomy 3:27; 34:1; 32:49).

These mountains are mentioned several times in the Bible:
 Balaam blessed Israel the second time from the top of Mount Pisgah (Numbers 23:14)
 From "the top of Pisgah" i.e. Mount Nebo, an area which belonged to Moab, Moses surveyed the Promised Land (Numbers 27:12 and Deuteronomy 3:27; 32:49), and there he died (34:1,5)
 The Israelites had one of their encampments in the mountains of Abarim (Numbers 33:47,48) after crossing the Arnon
 The prophet Jeremiah linked it with Bashan and Lebanon as locations from which the people cried in vain to God for rescue (Jeremiah 22:20)
 Jeremiah hid the Ark of the Covenant there (II Maccabees 2:4-5). (The book of 2 Maccabees is included in Bibles used by Roman Catholics, but generally not in Protestant or Jewish Bibles.)

See also

 Biblical names for geographical features possibly part of "Abarim"
 Mount Seir, the ancient name for the mountainous region between the Dead Sea and the Gulf of Aqaba; modern Jibāl ash-Sharāh
 Modern names for geographical features possibly synonymous or contained in "Abarim"
 Al-Sharat or Ash-Sharāh, a highland region in modern-day southern Jordan and northwestern Saudi Arabia
 Jibāl ash-Sharāh (see Mount Seir), with Petra, Jebe Harun/Mount Aaron, etc.
 Jebel Proywe, Jordanian mountain north of Little Petra
 Petra (ancient Reqem/Reqmu/Rakmu) in Seir
 Jebel Harun, or southern Mount Hor near Petra, with the alleged tomb of Aaron
 Related geographical features
 Midian Mountains, Saudi Arabian mountains to the south

References

External links

 Mount Nebo - Jordan (YouTube)

Mountains of Jordan
Hebrew Bible mountains
Transjordan (region)